Grodno Hydroelectric Power Station is a run-of-the-river hydroelectric power station on the Neman River, about  east of Grodno in Belarus. Construction on the  power station began in 2008 and it became operational on 1 September 2012. It is the largest hydroelectric power station in Belarus.

References

External links

Dams completed in 2012
Energy infrastructure completed in 2012
Dams in Belarus
Hydroelectric power stations in Belarus
Run-of-the-river power stations
Buildings and structures in Grodno